Matheus Bungenstab Stockl (born 14 March 2000) is a Brazilian footballer who plays as a defender for Villa Nova, on loan from Coimbra.

Career statistics

Club

References

2000 births
Living people
Brazilian footballers
Brazil youth international footballers
Association football defenders
Clube Atlético Mineiro players
Clube de Regatas Brasil players